Daniel Webster (March 26, 1912 – June 5, 1988) was an American Negro league pitcher in the 1930s.

A native of Montgomery, Alabama, Webster played for the Kansas City Monarchs in 1936, and for the Detroit Stars the following season. In eight recorded career games on the mound, he posted a 5.48 ERA over 44.1 innings. Webster died in Detroit, Michigan in 1988 at age 76.

References

External links
 and Seamheads

1912 births
1988 deaths
Detroit Stars (1937) players
Kansas City Monarchs players
Baseball pitchers
Baseball players from Montgomery, Alabama
20th-century African-American sportspeople